The Trieste–Opicina tramway (Triestine: Tram de Opcina) is an unusual hybrid tramway and funicular railway in the city of Trieste, Italy. It links Piazza Oberdan, on the northern edge of the city centre, with the village of Villa Opicina in the hills above.

The tramway is currently out of use, following an accident in August 2016, with a replacement bus service operating. Reopening of the line was postponed until February or March 2020, a deadline set by Trieste city council, and then delayed again due to the COVID-19 pandemic, but as of the end of 2021 was due to take place in 2022.

When in use, for most of the journey the line operates as a conventional, electrically powered tramway, with a mixture of street running and reserved track. On the steepest section of the line, between Piazza Scorcola and Vetta Scorcola, the trams are pushed uphill and braked downhill by a pair of cable tractors that operate on funicular principles.

The line forms part of the network of Trieste Trasporti, the public transport provider for Trieste.

History

As a rack and adhesion line 
Although the Austrian Southern Railway first arrived in Villa Opicina in 1857, the Villa Opicina railway station was situated some distance from the village, and the local topography forced a circuitous  railway route between Opicina and Trieste. As a result, various projects were promoted to link the two places more directly, resulting eventually in the construction of the Opicina Tramway by the Società Anonima delle Piccole Ferrovie di Trieste.

The line was opened in 1902, and as built incorporated a rack railway section between Piazza Scorcola and Vetta Scorcola. Conventional four-wheel tramcars operated the full length of the line, being assisted up and down the rack section by three small rack locomotives.

As a hybrid funicular and tramway 
In 1928 the rack railway section was replaced with a funicular section, and the rack locomotives by cable tractors. However, the original four-wheel trams continued running until 1935, when they were replaced by new bogie cars. The extension to Villa Opicina station was closed in 1938. After nearly 60 years of private ownership, the line was taken over by the municipality of Trieste in 1961.

The line has been modernised several times over the years, most recently in 2005–2006 and 2012–2014. However, it still uses four of the five 1935-built tramcars, supplemented by two similar cars built in 1942. Two of the original four-wheel cars have survived, and one sees occasional use as an operational museum car. New unmanned cable tractors were provided during the 2005–2006 rebuild, which are remotely operated by the tram drivers.

August 2016 accident
On 14 August 2016, trams 404 and 405 were involved in a collision at the passing loop at Conconello on the upper section of the line. Both cars were badly damaged, whilst eight passengers and both drivers were injured, with six requiring hospital treatment. With only three cars in operational condition, service on the line was suspended and replaced by a bus service.

The two damaged cars were repaired by early 2017, and in December 2017 the regional council granted €3 million to restore the tramway.

The line is still not operating.  Two of the cars are in the open air in the depot yard, while a third remains abandoned in the street in Trieste where the dummy is engaged.  A platform and turning circle for the bus 2 and 2/ have been constructed at Villa Opicina station. The bus pauses at the tram depot to allow a ticket to be purchased at the bar adjacent to the depot. There were reports of test runs in July and November 2022.

Route

Description 
The terminus in Piazza Oberdan has two tracks, although only one is normally used.

At its foot is a short stub siding that permits the cable tractor to be parked off the running-line. In the middle of the funicular section, at Romagna, is the first passing-loop, used in normal service. Whilst the line below the loop is single track, the final 120 metres or so of the loop below Vetta Scorcola is laid as very closely spaced double track, allowing each cable tractor to use a different track.

The longer upper section, from Vetta Scorcola to Villa Opicina, is mostly on roadside reservation or private right-of-way in open rural country. There are three passing-loops on this section, although only the one at Conconello is used in normal service, with the loops at Cologna Campo Sportivo and Campo Romano used only if extra services are running. The terminus at Villa Opicina is flanked by a five track depot.

Services
The line forms part of the network of Trieste Trasporti, the public transport provider for Trieste, and is line 2 of that company's system. When running, services are operated every 20 minutes from early morning (07:00) to early evening (20:00).

Stops 
From the Trieste end of the line, the line serves stops at:
Piazza Oberdan (terminus)  	
Piazza Scorcola 	
Sant'Anastasio 
Romagna  	
Vetta Scorcola 
Cologna Campo Sportivo 
Cologna Chiesetta 
Conconello 
Banne 
Obelisco 
Campo Romano 
Via Nazionale 	
Villa Opicina (terminus)

Equipment

Tramcars 

The line is operated by six steel-bodied four-axle electric tramcars numbered 401-402 and 404–407. Cars 401-405 were built in 1935 by Officine Meccaniche Stanga with Tecnomasio Italiano Brown Boveri electrical components. Cars 406-407 were built in 1942 by the same companies to a similar design, although war-time shortages resulted in  a more basic interior and different window detail. Car 403 was subsequently destroyed in an accident on 28 November 1975.

The cars take electricity from a 550 Volts DC overhead line.

Two of the original wooden-bodied four-wheel tramcars still exist. The original car 1 was built in 1902, at Graz in Austria, by Grazer Waggonfabrik with electrical components from Österreichische Union-Elektrizitätsgesellschaft. On the arrival of cars 401–407, it was converted into a works car numbered 411. In 1992 it was restored to its original condition and sees occasional service as a museum car. Car 6 has also survived and been recently restored, having been displayed as a static exhibit at the railway museum in Trieste Campo Marzio station.

Cable tractors 
On the funicular section of the line, the tramcars are pushed uphill and braked downhill by cable tractors, also known as cable dummies or, in Italian, carro scudo. These vehicles are permanently attached to the haulage cable. They are not coupled to the tramcars; gravity holds the lower end of the tramcar against the upper end of the cable tractor. There have been three generations of cable tractors on the line.

These cars were replaced in 1978 by two new vehicles, manufactured by Fuji Electric. Both these first two generations of cable tractor were operated by their own driver, separately from the driver of the tramcar.

In 2005, a third generation of unmanned cable tractors was introduced. These tractors are operated remotely by the drivers of the tramcars. Without the need for a cabin to accommodate a driver, these new cable tractors are low-profile vehicles, and thus do not obstruct the vision of the tramcar driver or the passengers when running downhill with the tractor leading.

See also 
 List of funicular railways
 Trolleybuses in Trieste
 Trams in Trieste

References

External links 
 
 Tramway from the official web site of Trieste Trasporti (in English)

Funicular railways in Italy
Metre gauge railways in Italy
Rack railways in Italy
Railway lines in Friuli-Venezia Giulia
Railway lines opened in 1902
Tram transport in Italy
Trieste
550 V DC railway electrification